Æthelberht may refer to:

 Æthelberht I of East Anglia, floruit circa 749
 Æthelberht II of East Anglia (died 794), Saint Æthelberht